Queen Industries is a fictional business organization in the DC Comics universe.  It is owned and run by Oliver Queen / Green Arrow.  Oliver reluctantly inherited the company after his parents, Robert and Moira Queen, were killed. It was founded by Robert.

Fictional history 
In the early days of Oliver's ownership, Queen Industries made much of its profits from the sale of weapons and munitions. In "Peacemakers", written by Dennis O'Neil, Oliver discovers some of the disastrous impacts that the weapons he is making his money from are having in other countries. As a result, Oliver decides to sell off what is left of the company, giving all of the proceeds to a war relief effort (This was a widely accepted retelling of the original story of how Queen lost his remaining fortune to a man named John Deleon).

For many years following, Queen Industries was without its namesake ebullient owner, as Green Arrow traversed the countryside, to discover the true America. During this period, he formed strongly liberal values (in stark contrast to his frequent conservative traveling partner, Green Lantern) which he was never shy about espousing, and which defined and motivated his later career.  The strength of his convictions indeed became one of his most indelible characteristics, and was a primary influence in the new treatment of social issues as a valid theme for mainstream superhero comics.

Eventually, Oliver Queen was able to reassert his control of Queen Industries, now divested of its weapons contracts.  He used the income from it to secretly fund his superhero activities. Originally, much of the money was funneled into bankrolling the fledgling Justice League. However, this ended when Oliver quit the JLA, having decided that they were only interested in fighting the big battles with the supervillains, and weren't looking out enough for "the little guy."  Since then, the income from Queen Industries has gone to charitable donations and to funding his own crime-fighting activities.

The company had changed hands several times. A recent story arc involved it being bought by the villainous Isabel Rochev, also known as "The Queen".

In September 2011, The New 52 rebooted DC's continuity. In this new timeline, Oliver Queen is based in Seattle, and using a subsidiary of Queen Industries called Q-Core as a front for his operations as Green Arrow. In addition to masking the research and development of his trick arrows, Q-Core had developed several very successful products like the Q-pad and Q-phone, making Oliver a billionaire mogul. Following the buy up of Queen Industries by Stellmoor Industries and their CEO, Simon Lacroix, followed by his destruction of Q-Core, the fate of the company is unknown.

In other media

Television

Smallville 
Queen Industries has been mentioned in Smallville, several times and is an electronics company in the series, as well as the workplace of pre-Toyman Winslow Schott. In this continuity, Oliver has a station in Queen Tower in Metropolis where his team meet before moving to Watchtower. In the season 8 episode "Requiem", it is revealed that Tess Mercer sold controlling interest in LuthorCorp to Queen Industries. However, in the series finale and the comic book continuation, after Lex Luthor regained control of LuthorCorp (later renaming it LexCorp), Queen Industries immediately dissolves its partnership with the Luthors after Lex Luthor's return.

Arrowverse 
 Known as Queen Consolidated in the Arrowverse and introduced in the Arrow television series, the company is headquartered in Star City, founded by Oliver's father Robert Queen. After Robert's death, his close friend and former partner Walter Steele serves as the company's chief executive officer, even before marrying Moira Queen (Oliver's mother, still alive in this version). The company experiences serious trouble after Moira Queen reveals her role in the Undertaking (a plan to destroy the "Glades", an area of the city where crime was particularly predominant, with an earthquake machine create by Unidac Industries, which is a subsidiary of Queen Consolidated). Malcolm Merlyn uses this device in the first-season finale to destroy a significant portion of the "Glades", causing the deaths of 503 people and destroying Moira's reputation and leading to her arrest and criminal trial in season two. Oliver takes the reins of the company, but he is caught in a power struggle with Stellmoor's Isabel Rochev, a 50% stakeholder, for much of the season. Oliver learns to trust Isabel and gives her the role of CEO so he can focus on his heroic career; she betrays him by using her new power to buy out the company on behalf of Slade Wilson, as part of his multi-pronged attack on all aspects of Oliver's life since she had been a lover to Robert Queen before he betrayed her for his family and company and fired her. However, Isabel is killed in Robert's old office the season two finale, and Deathstroke is incarcerated. In season three, Queen Industries is acquired by billionaire inventor Ray Palmer, who renames it Palmer Technologies. In season four, Ray's vice president Felicity Smoak, who is also Oliver's girlfriend, assumes Ray's position of CEO after an explosion at Palmer Technologies involving the Atom suit results in Ray decreasing to subatomic size (causing many to assume he died); however, her role as CEO results in the firing of many employees, including Curtis Holt, so she takes a break with Oliver to fix the issues with the company and keep the employees' jobs. However, during the final episodes of season four, Felicity neglects her role as CEO in favor of working full-time with Holt, the Green Arrow, and his team to stop global nuclear annihilation at the hands of Damien Darhk, and she is voted out of the company by its board. In the season seven finale, the Palmer Tech building is blown up by the Ninth Circle.
 In the show's spin-off, The Flash, a newspaper under the possession of S.T.A.R. Labs CEO Harrison Wells (latered revealed as time traveling speedster from the future Eobard Thawne), discloses that Queen Incorporated merges with WayneTech in 2024.
 In the show's spin-off, Legends of Tomorrow, in a possible future where Ray Palmer never returns from his adventures, the company is renamed Smoak Technologies and moved out of Star City due to Grant Wilson's attack.

Film 
 Queen Industries is mentioned in a Batman v Superman: Dawn of Justice viral marketing Fortune magazine article.

Video games 
 Queen Industries is referenced in Batman: Arkham Origins and in the newest addition to the Batman games Batman: Arkham Knight, the logo is featured on a tool box in the official trailer. The logo later appears on a shipping container in the actual game located on the Penguin's ship. Also in Penguin's office, there are lists of companies such as AmerTek, LexCorp and Queen Industries. In Arkham Knight, a Queen industries building is undergoing construction. The building features a different logo then the one seen in Origins where the "Q" is styled as an arrow instead of crosshairs. One of the Joker-infected people, Christina Bell is said to be Executive Director of Queen Industries.

See also 

 Kord Enterprises
 Wayne Enterprises

References 

1941 comics debuts
Fictional elements introduced in 1941
Green Arrow